Michael Patrick O'Brien (born June 22, 1976) is an American comedian, actor, and writer. O'Brien is best known for his tenure as a writer and featured player on the NBC sketch comedy series Saturday Night Live from 2009 to 2015. He is also the creator of the 2018 NBC comedy series A.P. Bio.

Career  

O'Brien was born in Blissfield, Michigan to Connie and James O’Brien. He attended the University of Michigan, where he majored in film-video and was the founder and editor of a monthly comedy newspaper named The Anti-Daily.

O'Brien moved to Chicago and began taking improv and sketch classes. At iO Chicago he performed with a group called The Reckoning (2001–present). He trained at the Second City in Chicago, eventually joining the company's mainstage, where he performed for one year as a part of "America: All Better".

Saturday Night Live
O'Brien worked as a staff writer on Saturday Night Live for seven seasons, joining the show in 2009, and also appeared as a featured player for the 2013–14 season. After his sole season as a featured player, he left the cast but continued to write for the show in his final season from 2014 to 2015. Some of O'Brien's sketches include "Monster Pals" starring James Franco as well as "Puppet Class" starring Bill Hader. His short films "Grow a Guy" and "The Jay-Z Story" were each given the title card, "A Mike O'Brien Picture" in season 40. After leaving the writing staff in season 41, O'Brien has continued to contribute short films under the title, A Mike O'Brien Picture.

7 Minutes in Heaven with Mike O'Brien
In 2011, O'Brien introduced 7 Minutes in Heaven with Mike O'Brien, a comedy routine in which he interviews celebrities in a closet and closes by trying to kiss the celebrity.

Tasty Radio
In 2015, O'Brien released a sketch comedy album entitled Tasty Radio, which features Bill Hader, Fred Armisen, Jason Sudeikis, Vanessa Bayer, Seth Meyers, John Mulaney, Jorma Taccone, John Lutz and Scarlett Johansson.

A.P. Bio
In 2018, he created the comedy series A.P. Bio, starring Glenn Howerton and Patton Oswalt. O'Brien's former SNL colleagues Lorne Michaels and Seth Meyers are also executive producers on the show. The series premiered on February 1, 2018. The series was canceled after two seasons on May 24, 2019. On July 17, 2019, it was announced that A.P. Bio would return for a third season on NBCU's streaming platform Peacock in 2020, and the show was renewed for a fourth season which ran in 2021 before the show was canceled again.

Bibliography

References

External links
 

Living people
1976 births
21st-century American comedians
21st-century American male actors
21st-century American screenwriters
American male comedians
American male television actors
American male television writers
American sketch comedians
American television writers
Male actors from Michigan
The New Yorker people
People from Blissfield, Michigan
Place of birth missing (living people)
Screenwriters from Michigan
University of Michigan alumni
21st-century American male writers